Peter St. John was an 18th-century American poet.

Peter St John may also refer to:

Peter St John (architect), living British architect
Peter St John, 9th Earl of Orkney (born 1938), Canadian academic and Scottish peer
Peter St. John, a fictional superhero within the Zenith comic strip